Zonanthus is a genus of flowering plants belonging to the family Gentianaceae.

Its native range is Cuba.

Species:
 Zonanthus cubensis Griseb.

References

Gentianaceae
Gentianaceae genera